was a town located in Mie District, Mie Prefecture, Japan.

As of 2003, the town had an estimated population of 11,153 and a density of 1,437.24 persons per km². The total area was 7.76 km².

On February 7, 2005, Kusu was merged into the expanded city of Yokkaichi.

External links
 Official website of Yokkaichi 

Dissolved municipalities of Mie Prefecture